An angiosome is a three-dimensional unit of skin and underlying tissues vascularized by a source artery, termed an arteriosome and drained by a vein termed a venosome. It is a concept that is used by plastic surgeons for the creation of perforator flaps and by interventional radiologists for the endovascular treatment of critical limb ischemia.

References 

Plastic surgery
Interventional radiology